Kosovo unilaterally declared independence from Serbia in 2008, a move which Serbia rejects. Serbia does not recognize Kosovo as an independent state and continues to claim it as the Autonomous Province of Kosovo and Metohija. Initially there were no relations between the two; however, in the following years there has been increased dialogue and cooperation between the two sides.

Negotiations facilitated by the European Union resulted in the 2013 Brussels Agreement on the normalization of relations between the governments of Kosovo and Serbia. The agreement pledged both sides not to block the other in the EU accession process, defined the structure of the police and local elections in all parts of Kosovo, and also established the proposal of the Community of Serb Municipalities.

The United States-mediated diplomatic talks agreed on the interconnection of air, train and road traffic, while both parties signed the 2020 agreement on the normalisation of economic relations. Kosovo and Serbia are expected to become part of the single market, known as Open Balkan.

Both parties agreed to a proposed normalisation agreement in EU mediated dialogue in February 2023 and through further negotiations accepted a roadmap and timescale for its implementation the following month.

Reaction to declaration of independence

Serbia strongly opposed Kosovo's declaration of independence, which was declared on 17 February 2008.  On 12 February 2008, the Government of Serbia instituted an Action Plan to combat Kosovo's anticipated declaration, which stipulated, among other things, recalling the Serbian ambassadors for consultations in protest from any state recognising Kosovo, which it has consistently done. Activities of ambassadors from countries that have recognised independence are limited to meetings with Foreign Ministry lower officials. The Serbian Ministry of the Interior issued an arrest warrant against Hashim Thaçi, Fatmir Sejdiu and Jakup Krasniqi on 18 February 2008 on charges of high treason.

On 8 March 2008, the Serbian Prime Minister Vojislav Koštunica resigned, dissolving the coalition government, saying it was too divided over the Kosovo situation to carry on. A pre-term parliamentary election was held on 11 May 2008, together with local elections. President Boris Tadić stated that the government fell "because there was no agreement regarding further EU integration".

On 24 March 2008, Slobodan Samardžić, Minister for Kosovo and Metohija, proposed partitioning Kosovo along ethnic lines, asking the United Nations to ensure that Belgrade can control key institutions and functions in areas where Serbs form a majority but other members of the Government and the President denied these claims. On 25 March 2008, the outgoing Prime Minister, Vojislav Koštunica stated that membership in the EU should be "left aside," until Brussels stated whether it recognised Serbia within its existing borders.

On 24 July 2008, the Government decided to return its ambassadors to EU countries. Other ambassadors were returned following the positive outcome of the vote in the UN General Assembly. Serbia has expelled diplomatic representations of all neighboring countries that subsequently recognised Kosovo's independence: Albania, Bulgaria, Croatia, Hungary, Montenegro, and North Macedonia.

On 15 August 2008, Serbian Foreign Minister Vuk Jeremić filed a request at the United Nations seeking a non-legally binding advisory opinion of the International Court of Justice of whether the declaration of independence was in breach of international law. The United Nations General Assembly adopted this proposal on 8 October 2008. In July 2010, the ICJ issued its opinion which found that Kosovo's declaration of independence "did not violate international law".

History

2008–2013

Since the declaration of independence, Serbia refused to deal directly with the Republic of Kosovo, but only through the international intermediaries UNMIK and EULEX. However, there has been some normalisation; beginning in 2011, an EU team persuaded Serbia to discuss some minor border issues with Kosovo; in February 2013, the presidents of Kosovo and Serbia met in Brussels. Liaison officers are also being exchanged. Belgrade and Pristina are urged to continue talks in Brussels, but Serbia is not obliged to recognize Kosovo at any point in the process.

On 27 March 2012, four Kosovo Serbs, including the mayor of Vitina, were arrested by Kosovo Police while attempting to cross the disputed border at Bela Zemlja back into Kosovo with campaign materials for an upcoming election. They were subsequently charged with "incitement to hatred and intolerance among ethnic groups".

The following day, trade unionist Hasan Abazi was arrested with fellow unionist Adem Urseli by Serbian police manning the Central Serbia/Kosovo crossing near Gjilan. Abazi was charged with espionage and Urseli with drug smuggling. Serbian Interior Minister Ivica Dačić stated of the arrests that "Serbian police did not wish to take this approach, but the situation obviously could no longer go on without retaliation... If someone wants to compete in arrests, we have the answer". According to his lawyer, Abazi was then held in solitary confinement. 
On 30 March, the Serbian High Court in Vranje ordered Abazi to be detained for thirty days on espionage charges dating to an incident in 1999 in which Abazi allegedly gave information to NATO. Abazi's arrest was protested by Amnesty International and Human Rights Watch as "arbitrary" and "retaliatory".

On 19 October 2012, normalisation talks mediated by the European Union began in Brussels with Serbian Prime Minister Ivica Dačić and Kosovo Prime Minister Hashim Thaçi, where the two PMs sat at the table and initiated talks on normalising relations between Pristina and Belgrade. Reaching such a deal was a necessary condition of Serbia's EU candidacy.
The governments slowly reached agreements and deals on various areas, such as freedom of movement, university diplomas, regional representation and on trade and international customs. In Brussels, Serbia and Kosovo agreed that implementation of the border agreement would start on 10 December 2012. A historic meeting took place on 6 February 2013, when Serbian president Tomislav Nikolić and Kosovar President Atifete Jahjaga sat at the same table for the first time since Kosovo declared independence.

Following a December 2012 agreement, the two nations swapped liaison officers who worked at EU premises in the two capitals. Pristina referred to these officers as "ambassadors", but Belgrade rejected such a designation.

Serbia's top officials met with the EU High Representative for Foreign Affairs and Security Policy Catherine Ashton in Brussels, on 11 March 2013, Serbian president Nikolić said that Serbia and Kosovo were very close to signing an agreement which would improve their relations.

On 19 April 2013, the two governments completed the Brussels Agreement that was hailed as a major step towards normalising relations, and would allow both Serbia and Kosovo to advance in European integration. The agreement is reported to commit both states not to "block, or encourage others to block, the other side's progress in the respective EU paths." Serbia can block Kosovo in international organizations, but it cannot stand in the way of Kosovo's European integration process. Amongst other measures the deal establishes a special police commander (Commander will be appointed by Pristina from a list submitted by Serbs) and appeal court (Under Pristina laws and procedures) for the Serb minority in Kosovo, but does not amount to a recognition of Kosovo's independence by Belgrade. There were no Special provisions in the agreement given to Serb communities in North Kosovo as all municipalities have the same rights and status. In news reports Ashton was quoted as saying, "What we are seeing is a step away from the past and, for both of them, a step closer to Europe", whilst Thaçi declared "This agreement will help us heal the wounds of the past if we have the wisdom and the knowledge to implement it in practice."

The accord was ratified by the Kosovo assembly on 28 June 2013.

2013–present negotiations

2013 Brussels Agreement

Kosovo–Serbia negotiations encountered difficulties in the wake of the agreement reached in Brussels.

On 7 August 2013, an agreement was announced between the two governments to establish permanent border crossings between Serbia and Kosovo throughout 2014. These are complex, highly emotive issues the details of which can be worked out gradually, in step with Kosovo's and Serbia's EU accession processes. For five member states, the question of Kosovo's independence is not about Kosovo per se: it is a question of local politics.

On 9 September 2013, an agreement was reached to allow Kosovo to apply for its own international dialling code. Two days later, the Serbian government announced the dissolution of the Serb minority assemblies it created in northern Kosovo in order to allow the integration of the Kosovo Serb minority into the general Kosovo population. In order to facilitate the integration of the Serb minority in the north into Kosovar society, the Kosovo parliament passed an amnesty law pardoning for past acts of resistance to Kosovo authorities. This principle was put into effect in early December, as the governments of Serbia and Kosovo agreed to the appointment of a Kosovo Serb as chief of police in the Serbian area of Northern Kosovo. The two governments also reached agreement in principle to allow Kosovo to apply for its own international dialing code once the Serbian government begins EU accession talks. On 19 September, a EULEX officer was killed in the Serb area of Kosovo in a drive by shooting, this murder viewed as an act by opponents of reconciliation.

In late 2014, Kosovo–Serbia negotiations reached standstill owing to the change of government in Kosovo which now advocated a more hardline approach towards Serbia. More difficulties arose in December 2014, as President of Serbia Tomislav Nikolic went against the position of the government by stating that any decision on Kosovo must be submitted to a referendum.

On 26 August 2015, Kosovo and Serbia signed a series of agreements in key areas, in a major step towards normalizing ties. Kosovo's foreign minister claimed it was a de facto recognition of independence, while Serbia's prime minister said it ensured representation for ethnic-Serbs in Kosovo. As a result of the agreements, Serbia can now move forward with its negotiations to join the EU. However, the Serbian government still opposes any initiative by the government of Kosovo joining UN agencies, and Kosovo's initiative regarding UNESCO membership was met with protest by Belgrade.

Community of Serbian Municipalities
 

On 13 December 2016, at the 3511th Council of the European Union meeting, the delegates urged Kosovo to swiftly implement in good faith its part of all past agreements, in particular the establishment of the Association/Community of Serb majority municipalities and to engage constructively with Serbia in formulating and implementing future agreements.
On 29 December 2016, the Minister of Foreign Affairs Ivica Dačić noted the significance of maintaining the dialogue and implementing all agreements, primarily those that apply to establishing the Community of Serb Municipalities. On 30 December 2016, Kosovo President Hashim Thaçi had stated that he hopes the questions of the Community would be resolved at the beginning of 2017. That never occurred, and deep divisions followed within the government.

2017 train incident

In January 2017, a train painted in Serbian flag colors and with the words "Kosovo is Serbia" was prevented from crossing into Kosovo. Serbian President Tomislav Nikolić stated that Serbia would send its army to Kosovo if Kosovo Serbs are attacked. Kosovo viewed the train as a provocation. Both Serbia and Kosovo mobilized their military forces along the Kosovo-Serbian border.

2018 Kosovo arrest of Serbian politician
Kosovar special police arrested Serbian politician Marko Đurić visiting Northern Mitrovica in March 2018. Despite being banned from entering Kosovo and warnings by the Kosovo police, Đurić decided to visit the northern part of Mitrovica. The Kosovo police armed with rifles followed by EULEX entered premises where local Serb politicians were having a meeting and arrested Đurić, who according to Pacolli is banned from entering as he "encourages hatred". Commenting on the event, President Vučić called the Kosovo state and police terrorists, and that they were out to take over northern Kosovo.

Trade sanctions (2018–2020)
On 6 November 2018, Kosovo announced a 10% tax on goods imported from Serbia and Bosnia-Herzegovina. The official justification for the new tariff was unfair trade practices and destructive behaviour aimed at Kosovo.

On 21 November 2018, Kosovo announced an increase in the tax rate to 100%. It is believed that the new policy was a response to Kosovo's third failed bid for Interpol membership, a result widely blamed on Serbian campaigning by Kosovar public officials. On the day of the announcement, the Deputy Prime Minister Enver Hoxhaj publicly tweeted: "Serbia is continuing its aggressive campaign against Kosovo in the int’l stage. [...] To defend our vital interest, [the] Government of Kosovo has decided today to increase the customs tariff to 100%. [...]”

On 1 April 2020, Kosovo abolished the 100% tax.

Belgrade–Pristina flights
On 20 January 2020, Serbia and Kosovo agreed to restore flights between their capitals for the first time in more than two decades. Eurowings, the no-frills subsidiary of German flag-carrier Lufthansa, will fly between Belgrade and Pristina. The deal came after months of diplomatic talks by Richard Grenell, the United States ambassador to Germany, who was named special envoy for Serbia-Kosovo relations by President Donald Trump the year before.

Energy
In April 2020 Kosovo's Transmission System Operator, KOSTT, was formally separated from Elektromreža Srbije through a vote by the European Network of Transmission System Operators for Electricity, ENTSO-E, which paved the way for Kosovo to become an independent regulatory zone for electricity.

The agreement was criticized in Serbia, who accused Pristina and Tirana of pursuing a "Greater Albania of energy". Marko Djuric, the Serbian government's liaison for Kosovo released a statement saying that "Serbia is the owner and builder of the power grids in Kosovo and Metohija, for which there is abundant evidence".

2020 economic normalization agreements

On 4 September 2020, under a deal brokered by the United States, Serbia and Kosovo agreed to normalise economic relations. The deal will encompass freer transit, including by rail and road, while both parties agreed to work with the Export–Import Bank of the United States and the U.S. International Development Finance Corporation and to join the Mini Schengen Zone, but also to commence rail links between them such as Niš-Pristina and Pristina-Merdare and to connect the Belgrade-Pristina rail network with a deep seaport on the coast of the Adriatic Sea They will also conduct a feasibility study with the U.S. Department of Energy concerning the shared Gazivoda Lake, which straddles the border between the two states. In addition to the economic agreement, Serbia agreed to move its embassy in Israel to Jerusalem from Tel Aviv starting in June 2021 and Israel and Kosovo agreed to mutually recognise each other.

September 2020 talks in Brussels
On 7 September, Serbian President Aleksandar Vučić and Kosovo Prime Minister Avdullah Hoti met for talks in Brussels hosted by Josep Borrell under the auspices of the European Union. At a press conference after the talks EU Special Representative for the Serbia-Kosovo Dialogue, Miroslav Lajcak, stated that "full progress" had been made in the areas of economic cooperation, missing persons and displaced people. Vučić and Hoti were supposed to meet again in Brussels on 28 September 2020 where they would discuss arrangements for minority communities, the settlement of mutual financial claims and property and will attempt to make progress towards a more comprehensive agreement. The second meeting was later postponed, in part due to Kosovo's refusal to discuss the formation of the Association/Community of Serb-majority municipalities.

2022 tensions

On 31 July, sirens in northern Kosovo sounded which resulted in Kosovo Serbs blocking the road near the Jarinje border crossing (located in the municipality of Leposavic). Serbian President Aleksandar Vučić said to the media, that Serbia has "never been in a more complex and difficult situation [regarding Kosovo] than it is today".

On 27 August, EU-facilitated dialogue between the Republic of Serbia and the Republic of Kosovo settled the dispute regarding identification documents. Serbia agreed to abolish entry and exit documents for Kosovo ID holders whilst Kosovo committed to refrain from implementing such measures for Serbian ID holders. Serbian President Aleksander Vučić stated that the ID card issue was “a tiny problem”, but the licence plate one was “much more complicated”.

On 3 October 2022, the far-right Serbian Party Oathkeepers together with the People's Party, New Democratic Party of Serbia, and Dveri, signed a joint declaration for the "reintegration of Kosovo into the constitutional and legal order of Serbia" in October 2022.

Agreement on the path to normalisation

In December 2022, the European Union forwarded a draft agreement to the authorities in Serbia and Kosovo at the EU-Western Balkans summit in Tirana. The proposed agreement is based on a previous draft drawn up by the French and German governments earlier in 2022. Under the terms of the draft agreement, both sides would agree to "develop normal, good neighborly relations with each other on the basis of equal right" and that "both parties will recognize each other's relevant documents and national symbols, including passports, diplomas, vehicle plates and customs stamps." The draft agreement further adds that Serbia will not oppose membership of Kosovo in any international organizations and Kosovo will form an "appropriate level of self-management for the Serbian community in Kosovo. Both parties will exchange permanent missions in their respective capitals. The proposal also allows for the formation of a joint commission, chaired by the EU, for monitoring its implementation. The EU hopes that the agreement could be signed by the end of 2023 and negotiations regarding the proposed agreement are expected begin in mid-January.

The final text, known as "Agreement on the path to normalization between Kosovo and Serbia", was reported to have been agreed in principle by Kosovo prime minister Albin Kurti and Serbian president Aleksandar Vučić on 27 February 2023 at a meeting in Brussels with EU High Representative for Foreign Affairs and Security Policy Josep Borrell and EU Special Representative for the Belgrade-Pristina Dialogue Miroslav Lajčák. The two are expected to meet again on 18 March to discuss a roadmap for its implementation. Kurti and Vučić met again on 18 March at Ohrid, North Macedonia and verbally accepted a roadmap for implementation of the agreement.

Representation
Under the terms of the Brussels Agreement signed in 2013, the governments of Serbia and Kosovo agreed to post liaison officers in each others capitals. The Government of Kosovo is represented in Serbia by the Liaison Office of Kosovo, Belgrade and likewise the Government of Serbia is represented in Kosovo by the Liaison Office of Serbia, Pristina. Both these missions are hosted by the European Union.

Sport
Kosovo is a full member of several international sporting organizations; this has caused conflict and tension when events are hosted in Serbia when Kosovo is to officially compete as its own country.

2021 AIBA World Boxing Championships

Kosovo's boxing team was denied entry into Serbia at border control, shutting them out of the tournament.

2022 World Athletics Indoor Championships

World Athletics, Kosovo, and Serbia reached a compromise where athletes from Kosovo would be allowed to compete at the 2022 World Athletics Indoor Championships in Belgrade, Serbia but a blank space would be displayed instead of Kosovo's flag on all official materials (including websites and stadium screens).

2022 European Youth Table Tennis Championships
In July 2022, competitors from Kosovo were prevented from participating in the European Youth Table Tennis Championships held in Belgrade, Serbia.

Minorities

Since the 1999 bombing of Yugoslavia, a large portion of Kosovo Serbs have been displaced from their homes, like other minorities throughout the province. A significant portion of Serbian Orthodox churches, as well as Serbian cemeteries and homes, have been demolished or vandalised.

The Serbian Government promised suspended Serb prison workers from Lipljan money if they were to leave the Kosovo institutions, which they were working in, so they did. However they were never paid, so staged a continued a blockade of the Co-ordination Centre in Gračanica. They claim that Belgrade, the Kosovo Ministry specifically, has not paid them money promised for leaving the Kosovo institutions.

Serbs have also responded by forming their own assembly.

In September 2013, the Serb government dismantled the Serb minority assemblies in North Mitrovica, Leposavić, Zvečan and Zubin Potok as part of an agreement with the government of Kosovo. At the same time, the President of Kosovo signed a law that granted amnesty to ethnic Serbs in Kosovo for past acts of resistance to Kosovo law enforcement authorities.

Kosovo pays considerable attention to the Albanian minority in Serbia. The Albanian minority in Serbia has voiced support for more rights in line with the rights of Serbs in Kosovo. In 2013, Isa Mustafa, then one of the leaders of opposition in Kosovo, referring to the Brussels Agreement said that "Once the programme for implementing the agreement is finished, Kosovo and Serbia have to open a discussion about the issue of the rights that Albanians who live in Preševo and in Serbia enjoy".

See also

Foreign relations of Kosovo
Foreign relations of Serbia
Belgrade–Pristina negotiations
Albania–Serbia relations
Albania–Kosovo relations
2008 protests against Kosovo declaration of independence
Kosovo Serbs
Albanians in Serbia
Serbo-Montenegrins in Albania

References

 
Serbia
Bilateral relations of Serbia
Independence of Kosovo